Implerstraße is an U-Bahn station in Munich on the  and the .

References

External links

Munich U-Bahn stations
Railway stations in Germany opened in 1975
1975 establishments in West Germany